Acraea insignis, the black-blotched acraea, is a butterfly in the family Nymphalidae. It is found in Ethiopia, the Democratic Republic of the Congo, Sudan, Uganda, Kenya, Tanzania, Malawi, Zambia, Mozambique and Zimbabwe.

Description

A. insignis Dist. (53 e). Forewing above scaled with red-yellow to the apex of the cell and the hinder angle, in the apical part transparent black-grey, at the end of the cell with a black transverse streak, otherwise without markings. Hindwing red-yellow with narrow black, unspotted marginal band about 1 mm. in breadth, which beneath is often grey at the distal margin, at the base with large confluent black spots and with large discal dots in 1 b to 2, of which the one in 2 covers the base of the cellule, and with a thick black transverse streak at the end of the cell; the discal dots in cellules 3-7 are entirely absent; beneath as above, but much lighter reddish white with a red band at the proximal side of the black marginal band. In the female the ground-colour is often grey-yellowish. Nyassaland; German and British East Africa; Uganda, f. siginna Suff. (54 a) is characterized by having the black spots in the basal part of the hindwing united into a large, deep black patch, which also covers the base of celhdes 3 to 6. German and British East Africa, especially in the high-lying localities.

Subspecies
Acraea insignis insignis — Ethiopia, Democratic Republic of the Congo, southern Sudan, Uganda, Kenya, Tanzania, Zambia, Malawi
Acraea insignis gorongozae van Son, 1963 — western Mozambique, eastern Zimbabwe

Biology
The habitat consists of forests.

Both sexes are attracted to flowers. Adults are probably on wing year round.

The larvae feed on Vitis, Gossypium, Adenia and Kiggelaria species. Young larvae are dark brownish moulting to orange brown at the third instar. The pupa is golden to orange lined with black.

Taxonomy
It is a member of the Acraea terpsicore species group - but see also Pierre & Bernaud, 2014

References

External links

Images representing Acraea insignis at Bold

Butterflies described in 1880
insignis
Butterflies of Africa
Taxa named by William Lucas Distant